Jon is a shortened form of the name Jonathan.

Jon or JON may also refer to:

People
 "Jon", an alternate spelling of John (given name)
 Jón, an Old Norse common name still widely used in Iceland and the Faroes
 Jon (Korean surname), also transliterated Jeon
 Jon (Serer surname)

Other uses
 Jon (film), a 1983 Finnish film
 Jon (Garfield), a Garfield Character
 JBoss Operations Network, network management software

See also 

 
 
 
 Jons (disambiguation)
 John (disambiguation)
 JNO
 ONJ (disambiguation)
 OJN (disambiguation)
 NJO (disambiguation)
 NOJ (disambiguation)